Naba Barrackpore Prafulla Chandra Mahavidyalaya, established in 1966, is a general degree college in New Barrackpore. It offers undergraduate courses in arts and commerce.  It is affiliated to West Bengal State University.

Departments

Arts and Commerce

Bengali
English
History
Economics
Commerce
Geography

Accreditation
Naba Barrackpore Prafulla Chandra Mahavidyalaya is recognized by the University Grants Commission (UGC).

See also
Education in India
List of colleges in West Bengal
Education in West Bengal

References

External links

Educational institutions established in 1966
Colleges affiliated to West Bengal State University
Universities and colleges in North 24 Parganas district
1966 establishments in West Bengal